The Right Connections is a 1997 television film directed by Chuck Vinson and starring Melissa Joan Hart and her four real life siblings.

Plot
A rap singer helps four siblings form a singing group to win a talent contest in order to raise money to help pay their mother's tax bill.

Cast
M.C. Hammer as Kendrick Bragg 
Melissa Joan Hart as Melanie Cambridge
Elizabeth Hart as Jamie Tompkins
Brian Hart as Chase Tompkins
Emily Hart as Marnie Tompkins
Alexandra Hart-Gilliams as Kaila Tompkins
Belinda Metz as Gail Tompkins, the widowed mother of Jamie, Chase, Marnie & Kaila
Meshach Taylor as Lionel Clark
Scott Vickaryous as Eric Landau

References

1997 films
Showtime (TV network) films
1997 television films
Films directed by Chuck Vinson
1990s English-language films